The Japan In-House Lawyers Association "JILA" (日本組織内弁護士協会) is the largest organization serving in the professional and business interests of attorneys who practice in the legal departments of corporations, associations, other private-sector organisations, and national and municipal governments in Japan. JILA advocates for the common interests of its members, provides resources to help save time, money and effort, contributes to their continuing education and provides a voice on issues of Japanese importance.

With more than 470 members, "JILA" connects its members to the people and resources necessary for both personal and professional growth.

References

External links 
 Official website (Japanese only)

Legal organizations based in Japan
Law-related professional associations